Richard Robinson, 1st Baron Rokeby (1708 – 10 October 1794), was an Anglo-Irish churchman.

Life
He was a younger son of William Robinson (died 1720) of Rokeby, Yorkshire and later of Merton, Surrey and Anne Walters (died 1730), daughter and heiress of Robert Walters of Cundall. Sir Thomas Robinson, 1st Baronet (1703-1777) was his elder brother. He was educated at Westminster School and Christ Church, Oxford (BA 1730, MA 1733, BD & DD 1748).

Robinson came to Ireland as chaplain to Lionel Sackville, 1st Duke of Dorset in 1751 when Dorset was reappointed Lord Lieutenant of Ireland, and was swiftly raised to the Irish episcopate as Bishop of Killala and Achonry. He was translated from the See of Kildare, which he had occupied since 1761, to the Archbishopric of Armagh in 1765.

In 1777 he was created Baron Rokeby, of Armagh in the County of Armagh, in the Peerage of Ireland, with special remainder to Matthew Robinson (1694–1778) of West Layton, in the North Riding of the county of Yorkshire, his second cousin, twice removed, who predeceased him.

In 1774 he founded the County Infirmary. In 1780 he donated land for the erection of a new prison and in 1771 he founded the Armagh Public Library. In 1790 he founded the Armagh Observatory as part of his plan for a university in Armagh.

Archbishop Lord Rokeby died at Clifton in Bristol on 10 October 1794, and was buried in Armagh Cathedral. He was succeeded by Matthew Robinson, 2nd Baron Rokeby, the son of his second cousin Matthew Robinson, who inherited his titles, and was a noted eccentric.

There is a memorial to Robinson in the south aisle at St Patrick's Cathedral, Armagh.

Reputation
Robert Walpole called Robinson 'a proud but superficial man'. John Wesley accused him of being more interested in buildings than in the care of souls.

Richard Cumberland described him as "splendid, liberal, lofty ... publicly ambitious of great deeds, and privately capable of good ones, ... he made no court to popularity by his manners but he benefited a whole nation by his public works".

Architectural benefactor
The Canterbury Gate at Christ Church, Oxford, completed in 1873, is one monument to Archbishop Lord Rokeby's munificence. The gate is inscribed:
MUNIFICENTIA ALUMNORUM PRAECIPUE RICARDI ROBINSON ARCHICEP. ARMAGH.
(By the munificence of alumni, especially of Richard Robinson, Archbishop of Armagh.)

References

External links
Portraits of Richard Robinson

Robinson, Richard
Robinson, Richard
People educated at Westminster School, London
Alumni of Christ Church, Oxford
Barons in the Peerage of Ireland
Peers of Ireland created by George III
Deans of Christ Church Cathedral, Dublin
Robinson, Richard
Ordained peers
Robinson, Richard
Robinson, Richard
Members of the Privy Council of Ireland
Bishops of Killala and Achonry
Bishops of Ferns and Leighlin
Anglican bishops of Kildare
Members of the Irish House of Lords
Anglican archbishops of Armagh
British expatriate archbishops